Asclepiades of Myrlea was a Greek grammarian, historian and astronomer disciple of Apollonius of Rhodes born in Myrlea (Bithynia) that lived in the 2nd and 1st centuries BC. At the time of Pompey he was a teacher in Rome. He lived for some time in Spain teaching grammar in Turdetania.

Work 
Of his numerous Greek writings only some fragments remain which include information about Bithynia as well as some Turdetan myths, collected by the Greek historian Pompeius Trogus.

Bibliography

References 

Ancient Greek writers
Ancient Greek grammarians
Ancient Greek historians
Historians from ancient Anatolia